Dove (sold as Galaxy in the UK, Ireland, the Middle East, India and Australia) is an American brand of chocolate owned and manufactured by Mars. Dove produces a wide range of chocolate candies, as well as other chocolate products such as milks, cakes and ice creams.

History 

The name comes from Dove Candies & Ice Cream, which were Chicago-based candy and ice cream shops owned by Leo Stefanos, a Greek-American in 1939. In 1956, Stefanos created the Dove brand of ice cream bars, which were only sold locally throughout Chicago until 1985 when distribution began in selected cities around the country. Dove was introduced to the UK as Galaxy in 1960. In 1986, the company was acquired by Mars, Incorporated.

Products 

Dove produces a wide range of chocolates including milk chocolate, dark chocolate, caramel, fruits, nuts, Minstrels, Ripple (milk chocolate with a folded or "rippled" milk chocolate center), Amicelli, Duetto, Promises, Bubbles, and Truffle. Related brands in other parts of the world include "Jewels", and "Senzi" in the Middle East. Dove also produces other chocolate products including ready-to-drink chocolate milk, hot chocolate powder, chocolate cakes, ice cream and more. Dove is known for the messages written on the inside of the foil wrapper of each individual chocolate piece.

 Dove Individuals
 Dove Caramel
 Dove Caramel Liaison
 Dove Milk Chocolate Large Bar
 Dove Dark Chocolate Large Bar
 Dove Extra Dark Chocolate 63% Cacao Large Bar 
 Dove Milk Chocolate with Almonds Large Bar
 Dove Milk Chocolate Singles Bar
 Dove Dark Chocolate Singles Bar
 Dove Milk Chocolate Miniatures
 Dove Dark Chocolate Miniatures
 Dove Ice Cream Bars
 Dove Mini Ice Cream Bars
 Dove Cookies
 Dove Sugar Free Chocolates
 Dove Truffle (discontinued in 2011 Celebrations, replaced by Twix)
 Dove Dark Peppermint Bar

See also
 List of chocolate bar brands

References

External links 

 Dove Chocolate Official Website

Mars confectionery brands
Chocolate bars
Ice cream brands
Products introduced in 1939
Brand name confectionery